Killer Camp is a British–American game show produced by Tuesday's Child Television. The series' first season aired on ITV2 as a Halloween Special 2019, on the five consecutive nights leading up to Halloween. After licensing the first season in Summer 2020, The CW commissioned a second season of the series in March 2021, resulting in it moving to the network as an original.

The second season premiered on The CW on 10 October 2021, as a part of the network's Fall 2021 schedule. On 18 October 2021, the series was pulled from the network's schedule after two episodes (it was later that the network will bring the remaining episodes to air during its summer lineup), and was replaced by repeats of Masters of Illusion.

Premise
The series revolves around eleven people who are dropped into an '80s inspired lakeside lodge where they learn it's not the Summer Camp they had envisioned, but a Killer Camp with a secret murderer among them.

The contestants are tasked with earning money whilst simultaneously decoding the killer's identity before they end up "dead" themselves.

Season 1 (2019)

Contestants

 Episodes 3 & 5 each featured a vote at the campfire, where the camper with the most votes would be killed - regardless of their affiliation. These episodes did not feature an Immunity Challenge.
 Rob was revealed to be the killer as a result of being suspected in Episode 3's vote. A twist was revealed that Rob had been working in cahoots with a second killer the whole time.

Episodes

Season 2 (2021)

Contestants

 Episodes 3, 6 & 8 each featured a vote at the campfire, where the camper with the most votes would be killed - regardless of their affiliation. No immunity challenge was held in these episodes - instead, two campers snuck into Bruce's house to try and win clues to the Killer's identity.
 Lindi was killed outside of the Campfire as part of the Killer's Double Murder Day "celebration".
 Kaleigh and Kobie were late arrivals to camp - both were still able to be suspected as Killer.

Episodes

Broadcast
The first series premiered in the US on 16 July 2020 as part of The CW's Summer 2020 programming lineup The CW liked the idea so much they commissioned a second season however this second season didn't do well on The CW leading it to be cancelled (it later announced that it will air the Remaining episodes in its summer lineup ). On 29 November, viewers in the UK were able to view the whole season via the ITV Hub with episodes airing on ITV2 every weekday until the end . In India, the series aired on Star World in July 2020.

International version
A Dutch version of the show will premiere on Amazon Prime Video and will be produced by Skyhigh TV.

Notes

References

External links
 
 

2010s British game shows
2019 British television series debuts
2020s American game shows
2020s American television series
2020s British game shows
2021 American television series debuts
2021 British television series endings
2022 American television series endings
English-language television shows
Halloween television specials
ITV game shows
Television shows about death games
The CW original programming